Lillian Schnitzer Fountain is an outdoor 1875 fountain and bronze sculpture by J. Warrington Wood, installed outside Hermann Park's Houston Garden Center in Houston, Texas, United States. The work was created in Rome and dedicated in Lillian Schnitzer's memory in 1964 by George Schnitzer.

The statue depicts a kneeling woman and rests on a granite pedestal and concrete base. She holds a water jug in her proper right hand and has her opposite arm raised to her chest. The sculpture is set within a brick-lined pool, which displays a plaque that reads:  Another plaque at the rear of the pools displays the text: .

See also

 1875 in art
 List of public art in Houston

References

1875 establishments in Texas
1875 sculptures
Bronze sculptures in Texas
Concrete sculptures in Texas
Fountains in Texas
Granite sculptures in Texas
Monuments and memorials in Texas
Outdoor sculptures in Houston
Sculptures of women in Texas
Statues in Houston
Hermann Park